Badzhigata or Badzhigat is a settlement in the Dzau district of South Ossetia.

See also
 Dzau district

Notes

References  

Populated places in Dzau District